Christiane Singer, married name Christiane Thurn-Valsassina (23 March 1943, in Marseille – 4 April 2007, in Vienna) was a French-Austrian writer, essayist and novelist.

Biography 
Her father was of Hungarian origin and her mother was half Russian and half Czech. Because of the persecution of the Jews, her parents fled Hungary, then Austria, and settled in Paris, France, in 1935. She was born eight years later, in 1943, in Marseille.

She attended high school and the Conservatory of Theatre and Dramatic Arts in Marseille and then went on to study literature at the University of Aix-en-Provence, where she obtained a Doctorate of Modern Literature.

In 1968, she met Count Georg von Thurn-Valsassina, an architect, who would become her husband, and settled in 1973 in his medieval castle of Rastenberg (Austria), not far from Vienna. There she raised their two sons. This castle inspired the poetical essay of the same name in 1996, "Rastenberg". She also organized personal development seminars in her home, which she designed, and which her architect husband built.

In the late 1970s she founded the Dianus-Trikont-Verlag in Munich together with the editor .

She followed the teachings of Karlfried Graf Dürckheim (a disciple of C.G. Jung).

In Switzerland, she was a lecturer at the University of Basel, then a lecturer at the University of Friburg.

Her work and her personal reflection were entirely centered on the necessary taking into account of the spiritual which lives in everyone's heart. She was a relatively prolific writer, of Christian sensitivity imbued with Oriental wisdom, who refrained from giving lessons in morals and excludeed all dogmatism. She won several literary prizes, including the Prix des libraires for La Mort viennoise in 1979, le Prix Albert Camus for Histoire d'âme in 1989, and le prix de la langue française en 2006 for the whole of her work.

She once said in a radio-interview: 

In September 2006, when doctors announced that she had six months left to live as a result of cancer, she wrote a diary in her last months, which was  published under the title Derniers fragments d'un long voyage.

Work

Novels 
1965: Les Cahiers d'une hypocrite, Albin Michel
1965: Vie et mort du beau Frou, Albin Michel
1976: Chronique tendre des jours amers, Albin Michel
1978: La Mort viennoise, Albin Michel, prix des libraires 1979
1981: La Guerre des filles, Albin Michel, prix Alice-Louis Barthou of the Académie française. 1982
1981: Histoire d'âme, Albin Michel, reissued 2001 prix Albert Camus 1989
1996: Rastenberg, Albin Michel
2002: Les Sept Nuits de la reine, Albin Michel
2006: Seul ce qui brûle, Albin Michel, Prix ALEF 2007.

Essays 
1983: Les Âges de la vie, Albin Michel
1992: Une passion. Entre ciel et chair, Albin Michel,  1993.
1996: Du bon usage des crises, Albin Michel
2000: Éloge du mariage, de l'engagement et autres folies, Albin Michel (prix Anna de Noailles de l'Académie française.
2001: Où cours-tu, Ne sais-tu pas que le ciel est en toi ?, Albin Michel
2005: N'oublie pas les chevaux écumants du passé, Albin Michel
2007: Derniers fragments d'un long voyage, Albin Michel,   essay / narrative / diary

 Collective
2000: La Quête du sens, collectif, Albin Michel, reissued 2004 with Khaled cheikh Bentounès, Marie de Hennezel, Stan Rougier

Distinctions 
 1979: prix des libraires for La Mort viennoise
 1982: prix Alice-Louis Barthou de l'Académie française for La Guerre des filles.
 1989: prix Albert Camus for Histoire d'âme
 1993: prix Écritures & Spiritualités for Une passion. Entre ciel et terre.
 2000: prix Anna de Noailles of the Académie française for Éloge du mariage, de l'engagement et autres folies.
 2006: prix de la langue française pour l'ensemble de son œuvre
 2007: prix ALEF for Seul ce qui brûle.

Documentary about the author 
 Passion - Hommage à Christiane Singer, de la cinéaste autrichienne Carola Mair, documentaire, 45 min.

References

External links 
 Articles and documents à propos Christiane Singer
 Christiane Singer on YouTube
 Christiane Singer on Les insoumis
 Christiane Singer on Babelio
 Le dernier message de Christiane Singer on Psychologie

20th-century French non-fiction writers
21st-century French non-fiction writers
French Roman Catholic writers
French women essayists
20th-century French essayists
21st-century French essayists
Prix des libraires winners
Writers from Marseille
1943 births
2007 deaths
Deaths from cancer in France
20th-century French women writers
21st-century French women writers